The Texas Rangers are an American professional baseball team based in the Dallas–Fort Worth metroplex. The Rangers compete in Major League Baseball (MLB) as a member club of the American League (AL) West division. In 2020, the Rangers moved to the new Globe Life Field in Arlington after having played at Globe Life Park (now Choctaw Stadium) from 1994 to 2019. The team's name derives from a historic law enforcement agency.

The franchise was established in 1961, as the Washington Senators, an expansion team awarded to Washington, D.C., after the city's first AL ballclub, the second Washington Senators, moved to Minnesota and became the Twins (the original Washington Senators played primarily in the National League during the 1890s). After the  season, the new Senators moved to Arlington, and debuted as the Rangers the following spring.

The Rangers have made eight appearances in the MLB postseason, seven following division championships in 1996, 1998, 1999, 2010, 2011, 2015, and 2016 and as a wild card team in 2012. In 2010, the Rangers advanced past the division series for the first time, defeating the Tampa Bay Rays. The team then won their first American League pennant after beating the New York Yankees in six games. In the 2010 World Series, the franchise's first, the Rangers fell to the San Francisco Giants in five games. They repeated as American League champions the following year, then lost the 2011 World Series to the St. Louis Cardinals in seven games.

From 1961 through the 2022 season the Rangers' all-time regular season win–loss record is 4,650–5,146.

History

Washington Senators (1961–1971)
When the original Washington Senators announced their move to Minnesota to become the Twins in 1961, Major League Baseball decided to expand a year earlier than planned to stave off the twin threats of competition from the proposed Continental League and loss of its exemption from the Sherman Antitrust Act. As part of the expansion, the American League added two expansion teams for the  season–the Los Angeles Angels and a new Washington Senators team. The new Senators and Angels began to fill their rosters with American League players in an expansion draft. The team played their inaugural season at old Griffith Stadium, then moved to the new District of Columbia Stadium in 1962 under a ten-year lease.

For most of their existence, the new Senators were the definition of futility, losing an average of 90 games a season. The team's struggles led to a twist on a joke about the old Senators: "Washington: first in war, first in peace and still last in the American League." Their only winning season was in 1969 when Hall of Famer Ted Williams managed the club to an 86–76 record, placing fourth in the AL East. Frank Howard, an outfielder/first baseman from 1965 to 1972 known for his towering home runs, was the team's most accomplished player, winning two home run titles. The concurrent rise of the nearby Baltimore Orioles to regular championship contenders (winning their first World Series in ) did not help the Senators' cause either.

Ownership changed hands several times during the franchise's stay in Washington and was often plagued by poor decision-making and planning. Following their brief success in 1969, owner Bob Short was forced to make many questionable trades to lower the debt he had incurred to pay for the team in late 1968; the purchase price was reported at $9.4 million. By the end of the 1970 campaign, Short had issued an ultimatum: unless someone was willing to buy the Senators for $12 million (by comparison, the New York Yankees were sold in 1973 for $8.8 million), he would not renew the stadium lease and would move the team elsewhere.

At first, it looked like a move to Buffalo, New York, was in the works as at the time, a proposed multi-use stadium was in the cards in either downtown Buffalo where the current KeyBank Center is, or in suburban Lancaster to share with the Buffalo Bills; however, the project went over budget and the Senators started to look elsewhere while the Bills opened up Rich Stadium instead.  Short was especially receptive to an offer brought up by Arlington, Texas, mayor Tom Vandergriff, who had been trying to obtain a major league sports team to play in the Metroplex for over a decade. Years earlier, Charles O. Finley, the owner of the Kansas City Athletics, sought to relocate his baseball team to Dallas, but the idea was rebuffed and ultimately declined by the other AL team owners(the A's ultimately moved to Oakland, California in 1968). Arlington's hole card was Turnpike Stadium, a 10,000-seat park built in 1965 to house the Double-A Dallas–Fort Worth Spurs of the Texas League. However, it had been built to MLB specifications, and only minor excavations would be necessary to expand the park to accommodate major league crowds.

Vandergriff's offer of a multimillion-dollar down payment prompted Short to make the move to Arlington. On September 21, 1971, American League owners voted 10–2 to allow the move of the franchise to Arlington for the 1972 season. Senators fans were livid, and enmity came to a head at the club's last game in Washington on Thursday, September 30. Thousands simply walked in without paying after the security guards left early, swelling the paid attendance of 14,460 to around 25,000, while fans unfurled a "SHORT STINKS" banner. With two outs in the top of the ninth inning and the Senators leading 7–5, several hundred youths stormed the field, raiding it for souvenirs. One man grabbed first base and ran off with it. With no security in sight and only three bases, umpire crew chief Jim Honochick forfeited the game to the New York Yankees.

The nation's capital went without Major League Baseball for 33 years, until the relocation of the National League's Montreal Expos, who became the Washington Nationals in 2005.

Texas Rangers (1972–present)

Naming of the Rangers

After moving from Washington, the Senators were renamed after the Texas Rangers, the state-wide investigative law-enforcement agency which was founded by Stephen F. Austin in 1823 when Texas was part of Mexico, and whose mythology led to fictional characters such as The Lone Ranger and Walker, Texas Ranger. But the Rangers also had bouts as vigilante squads, when they abused their authority, including by lynching Hispanics. In the wake of 2020's Black Lives Matter protests, prominent mainstream voices have shined a light on the historical racism associated with the law-enforcement agency and called for the baseball team to abandon the Rangers name. The baseball team responded by committing to keeping the Rangers name. The team subsequently made a statement clarifying that despite sharing the name, they are not affiliated with the law-enforcement agency and they stand for equality by "condemn[ing] racism, bigotry and discrimination in all forms."

First years in Texas (1972–1984)

Prior to the 1972 season, improvements were made to Turnpike Stadium, which reopened as Arlington Stadium, in preparation for the inaugural season of the Texas Rangers. The team played its first game on April 15, 1972, a 1–0 loss at the hands of the California Angels, their 1961 expansion cousins. The next day, the Rangers defeated the Angels, 5–1, for the club's first victory.

In 1974, the Rangers experienced their first winning season after finishing last in both 1972 and 1973. Under the ownership of Brad Corbett, they finished second in the American League West with an 84–76 record, behind the eventual World Series champion Oakland Athletics. The 1974 Rangers are still the only MLB team to finish above .500 after two consecutive 100-loss seasons. Mike Hargrove was awarded American League Rookie of the Year, Billy Martin was named AL Manager of the Year, Jeff Burroughs won AL MVP, and Ferguson Jenkins was named the Comeback Player of the Year after winning 25 games, a club record to this day. The team posted winning records again from 1977 to 1979 but fell short of reaching the playoffs. The Rangers came very close to clinching a playoff spot in 1981, but wound up losing the first half of the AL West by one-and-a-half games to Oakland at the time of the players' strike. Texas went on to finish under .500 each season through 1985.

The Rangers faced an attendance problem for a few years in Texas, due in part to both the team's inconsistent performance and the oppressive heat and humidity that can encompass the area in the summer. Until the Florida Marlins arrived in 1993, Arlington Stadium was often the hottest stadium in the majors, with temperatures frequently topping  throughout the summer. So, the Rangers began playing most of their weekend games between May and September at night, a tradition that continues to this day.

Valentine, Ryan, and Bush (1985–1994)

Manager Bobby Valentine became steward over an influx of talent in the late 1980s and early 1990s. A winning season in 1986 was a shock to pundits and fans alike as the Rangers remained in the race for the American League pennant for the entire season. With a team consisting of stellar young rookies such as Rubén Sierra, Pete Incaviglia, Mitch Williams, Bobby Witt, and Edwin Correa, the Rangers finished the season in second place with an 87–75 record, just five games behind the division-champion Angels. The season marked a dramatic 25-win improvement over the 1985 season, which resulted in yet another last-place finish in the West. The signing of 41-year-old star pitcher Nolan Ryan prior to the 1989 season allowed Ryan to reach his 5,000th strikeout, 300th win, and 6th and 7th no-hitters with the Rangers. Despite powerful lineups including the likes of Juan González, Rubén Sierra, Julio Franco, and Rafael Palmeiro and a pitching staff that also included Charlie Hough, Bobby Witt, Kevin Brown, and Kenny Rogers, Valentine's Rangers never finished above second place and he was relieved of his duties during the 1992 season.

In April 1989, Rangers owner and oil tycoon Eddie Chiles, sold the team to an investment group headed by George W. Bush for $89 million. While his own equity in the team was a small one ($500,000), Bush was named Managing General Partner of the new ownership group. He increased his investment to $600,000 the following year. Bush left his position with the Rangers when he was elected Governor of Texas in 1994, and he sold his stake in the team in 1998. Bush went on to be elected President of the United States in 2000.

During Bush's tenure, the Rangers and the City of Arlington decided to replace the aging Arlington Stadium with a new publicly funded stadium, at a cost of $193 million, financed by Arlington residents, through a sales tax increase. Ground was broken on October 30, 1991, on what would become The Ballpark in Arlington (now named Globe Life Park in Arlington).

In 1993, Kevin Kennedy took over managerial duties, presiding over the team for two seasons, keeping the 1993 Rangers in the hunt for a playoff berth into mid-September; Nolan Ryan also retired after that season. Kennedy was let go in 1994, although the team led the AL West prior to the players' strike which prompted commissioner Bud Selig to cancel the remainder of the season and the playoffs. On July 28, Kenny Rogers pitched the 12th perfect game in major league history in Arlington against the California Angels.

First division titles (1995–2000)

Johnny Oates was hired as the Rangers' manager in 1995. Oates and company helped to bring home the 1996 AL Western Division Championship, the first division championship in franchise history. The first playoff series, 24 years after the franchise came to Texas, saw the Rangers lose to the New York Yankees, 3 games to 1. Oates was named AL Manager of the Year and Juan González was named AL MVP. The team featured a powerful lineup of hitters including González, Iván Rodríguez, and Rusty Greer, but continued to struggle with pitching despite having Rick Helling and Aaron Sele on their roster. Oates led the team to consecutive AL West championships in 1998 and 1999. Neither of Oates' last two playoff teams could win a single game, losing all six in back-to-back sweeps at the hands of the Yankees, a team that won three World Series in the 1990s after defeating Rangers teams in the first round. The 1999 team was to be the last playoff-bound team until 2010. En route to a second-straight last-place finish, Oates resigned his position 28 games into the 2001 season.

In 1998, venture capital billionaire Tom Hicks bought the team for $250 million.

The lean years and the A-Rod era (2001–2004)

Prior to the 2001 season, star free agent shortstop Alex Rodriguez was signed by the Rangers in the most lucrative deal in baseball history: a 10-year, $252 million contract. The move was controversial and is frequently maligned by fans and writers who thought that owner Tom Hicks was placing too much emphasis on one player instead of utilizing team resources to acquire several players, especially for a team that lacked pitching talent. Club officials maintained that Rodriguez would be the cornerstone of future postseason success. Although Rodriguez's individual performance was outstanding, the Rangers continued to struggle, and manager Jerry Narron was fired following the 2002 season and was replaced by seasoned manager Buck Showalter. The 2003 season signified the Rangers' fourth-straight last-place finish, and after a postseason fallout between Rodriguez and club management, the reigning AL MVP and newly appointed Rangers captain was traded to the New York Yankees for second baseman Alfonso Soriano and infield prospect Joaquin Arias.

The Rangers battled with the Anaheim Angels and Oakland Athletics for first place in the AL West for much of the 2004 season. Mark Teixeira, Alfonso Soriano, Michael Young, and Hank Blalock became some of the best-hitting infielders in the league, with Young, Blalock, and Soriano being selected for the 2004 All-Star Game. Soriano was named the All-Star MVP after going 2 for 3 with a three-run home run. Despite a late-season push, the Rangers ended up losing six of their final ten games and finished in third place behind the Angels and A's, a mere three games out of first place.

Making changes (2005–2009)

In 2005, the Rangers again struggled to find consistency amid controversy and injuries. John Hart stepped down as general manager following the 2005 season. Jon Daniels was promoted from assistant general manager to replace him. Daniels, at 28 years and one month, became the youngest general manager in major league history.

Daniels and the Rangers front office were very active in acquiring new players before and during the 2006 season. New acquisitions included Brad Wilkerson, Adam Eaton, Kevin Millwood, Carlos Lee, and Nelson Cruz. Despite bolstering their roster, the Rangers' 2006 season ended with a disappointing 80–82 record and a third-place finish in the AL West. Buck Showalter was dismissed as manager after the season. The team hired Oakland third base coach Ron Washington as their next manager. A change at manager was the first of several moves to strengthen the team in yet another busy offseason. The team lost Gary Matthews, Jr., Mark DeRosa, Carlos Lee, and Adam Eaton, but gained Kenny Lofton, Sammy Sosa, Frank Catalanotto, and pitchers Éric Gagné and Brandon McCarthy.

The Rangers struggled offensively early in the 2007 season, despite playing in a notoriously hitter-friendly park. A number of roster moves before the 2007 trade deadline were the beginnings of a rebuilding project headed by Jon Daniels with a focus on the acquisition and development of young players. In the coming years, more club resources would be dedicated to improving the quality of the farm system and scouting departments, most notably in Latin America and the Far East. Daniels' objective was to field a legitimately competitive team by the 2010 season.

The Rangers began the 2008 season exceptionally well, headlined by newcomer Josh Hamilton who looked to be a threat to win the Triple Crown, before fading off as the season wore on. During the All-Star festivities at Yankee Stadium, Hamilton crushed a first-round home run record in the 2008 Home Run Derby with 28. Hamilton hit another four in the second round and three during the final round, for a total of 35 home runs, but lost to the Twins' Justin Morneau. Four Rangers played in the All Star Game: Hamilton, Ian Kinsler, Milton Bradley, and Michael Young, who would repeat his 2006 All-Star Game feat by driving in the winning run via a sac fly.

The Rangers finished the season with yet another sub-.500 record (79–83), yet ended the season second in the AL West, the club's best finish since 1999. The 2009 season saw the Rangers soar into playoff contention for the first time since 2004. Despite injuries to Josh Hamilton and Ian Kinsler, the Rangers held first place in their division for long stretches of the summer before fading after September 1, losing the division to the Los Angeles Angels. The Rangers finished the season at 87–75, their first winning season since 2004 and good enough for second place in the AL West. Michael Young responded to his move to third base by posting one of his best offensive seasons ever while committing just nine errors and earning a sixth-straight All-Star appearance. Josh Hamilton and Nelson Cruz were also named 2009 AL All-Stars.

Rangers Baseball Express, LLC
Following financial problems, including defaulting on a $525 million loan, Tom Hicks and Hicks Sports Group reached an agreement to sell the Texas Rangers to group headed by Pittsburgh sports lawyer Chuck Greenberg and Rangers team president Nolan Ryan for approximately $570 million on January 22, 2010. Hicks also sold much of the land surrounding Rangers Ballpark to Greenberg and Ryan's group in a separate deal.

However, one of HSG's principal lenders, Monarch Alternative Capital, opposed the sale on grounds that the proceeds would not fully repay the defaulted HSG notes. On April 21, Major League Baseball issued a statement declaring the Rangers' sale to be under the control of the Commissioner to expedite the process. As the stalemate between HSG and its creditors continued, the Texas Rangers filed for Chapter 11 bankruptcy on May 24. As of that date, the Rangers and HSG had an estimated debt of $575 million. Much of the unsecured debt was owed in back salary. Yankees third baseman Alex Rodriguez topped the list of unsecured creditors with an estimated $24.9 million owed by the Rangers. The sale would repay all the team's creditors, including Rodriguez and other players owed back salary. Following a court-ordered public auction to be held on August 4 with the winning bid submitted by Greenberg/Ryan, the bankruptcy court closed the case. The sale to Greenberg/Ryan was approved by all 30 MLB owners at the owners meeting in Minneapolis on August 12. The new ownership group was called Rangers Baseball Express, LLC and had Chuck Greenberg serving as managing general partner and Nolan Ryan as club president. Oil magnates Ray Davis and Bob R. Simpson paid the bulk of the $539 million sale price, and became co-chairmen, with the largest stakes in the ownership group. However, they remained mostly in the background as senior consultants, leaving the team mostly in Greenberg and Ryan's hands.

Rise to contention (2010–2016)

With the influx of talent and success in 2009, the Rangers entered the 2010 season expecting to compete for the division and achieve the front office's 2007 goals. During the off-season, Nolan Ryan spoke about the Rangers' chances in the upcoming season saying, "My expectations today are that we're going to be extremely competitive and if we don't win our division, I'll be disappointed."

After stumbling out of the gates with a sub-.500 start in April 2010, the Rangers took the division lead with a franchise-best month of June, going 21–6. The Rangers never relinquished first place after an 11-game winning streak. The team made several mid-season moves to acquire players such as Cliff Lee, Bengie Molina, Jorge Cantú, and Jeff Francoeur. After the All-Star Game, in which six Rangers were present, came the debut of the claw and antler hand gestures, which gained much popularity, especially after the release of various apparel and souvenir options. Foam claws and helmets with deer antlers became quite commonplace in the ballpark as the Rangers played further into the fall. The Rangers won the AL West on September 25, advancing to the postseason for the first time since 1999 with a 90–72 record. The Rangers entered the playoffs against the Tampa Bay Rays in the first round, which ultimately resulted in a 3–2 series victory and marked the first postseason series victory in the 50-year history of the Rangers/Washington Senators franchise. Facing the Rangers in the American League Championship Series were the defending World Champion New York Yankees, the team the Rangers failed against three separate times in the 1990s. In a six-game ALCS, Texas came out victorious, winning the first pennant in franchise history in front of an ecstatic home crowd. Josh Hamilton was awarded ALCS MVP. The Rangers faced the San Francisco Giants in the 2010 World Series, but their offense struggled against the Giants' young pitching and eventually lost the Series, 4–1.

In March 2011, Chuck Greenberg resigned as Chief Executive and Managing General Partner and sold his interest in the Rangers after a falling out with his partners. Following his resignation, Nolan Ryan was named CEO in addition to his continuing role as team president. Ryan was subsequently approved as the team's controlling owner by a unanimous vote of the 30 owners of Major League Baseball on May 12.

The Rangers successfully defended their AL West Division title in 2011, making the club's second-straight division title and postseason appearance. The Rangers set records for best win–loss record (96–66, .592) and home attendance (2,946,949). On October 15, they went back to the 2011 World Series after beating the Detroit Tigers 15–5 in game six of the ALCS. The series featured Nelson Cruz hitting six home runs, the most home runs by one player in a playoff series in MLB history. In Game 2, Cruz also became the first player in postseason history to win a game with a walk-off grand slam as the Rangers defeated the Tigers 7–3 in 11 innings. However, they proceeded to lose to the St. Louis Cardinals in seven games, after twice being one strike away from the championship in game six.

The Rangers dominated the American League standings for much of the 2012 season, but floundered in September, culminating in a sweep by the Oakland Athletics in the final series. They did, however, qualify for the first American League wild-card playoff game. In the new Wild Card Game, the Rangers' woes continued, as they lost 5–1 to the Orioles. The Rangers figured in the 2013 wild card as well. They finished the season in second place in the American League West with a 91–72 record, tied with the Tampa Bay Rays for a wild card spot. A 163rd play-in tie-breaker game was held to determine the second participant in the 2013 American League Wild Card Game against the Cleveland Indians. The Rangers lost to the Rays, 5–2, in the tie-breaker and were eliminated from playoff contention after reaching the postseason in three consecutive seasons. Nolan Ryan stepped down as Rangers CEO effective October 31, 2013. Since then, Daniels has served as operating head of the franchise, with Davis and Simpson continuing to serve mostly as senior consultants.

Injuries took a major toll on the Rangers in 2014. The lone bright spot was Adrián Beltré, who despite spending some time injured, was the most consistent offensive player on the team. On September 4, 2014, the Rangers became the first MLB team officially eliminated from 2014 postseason contention when a 10–2 loss at home to the Seattle Mariners dropped their record to 53–87. The following day, manager Ron Washington resigned, citing personal issues. With the acquisition of Cole Hamels in 2015, the Rangers overtook the Houston Astros to clinch the American League West title on the final day of the season with a record of 88–74. The Rangers went on to lose to the Toronto Blue Jays in five games in the Division Series after squandering a 2–0 series lead. Texas again clinched the AL West in 2016, but lost to Toronto, 3–0, in the ALDS.

2017–present
The Rangers finished the 2017 campaign 23 games out of first place with a 78–84 record. In 2018, the Rangers partnered with the KBO League's LG Twins, in business and baseball operations. On September 21, 2018, holding on to a 64–88 record, the Rangers fired Jeff Banister who had led the team since 2015. He was replaced by bench coach Don Wakamatsu for the remainder of the season. The Rangers ended the season at 67–95. Chris Woodward was later selected to be the team's manager beginning with the 2019 season. He led the team to a 78–84 record in his first season. The 2019 season also marked the Rangers' final season of play at Globe Life Park. On September 29, 2019, the Rangers played their final game at Globe Life Park, a 6–1 win over the New York Yankees.

Following a delayed start to the 2020 season due to the COVID-19 pandemic, the Rangers played their first regular season game at the new Globe Life Field on July 24, 2020, a 1–0 win over the Colorado Rockies. They ended the contracted season in fifth place at 22–38.

On April 5, 2021, the Texas Rangers hosted the first full-capacity sporting event in the United States since the pandemic began with more than 38,000 fans in attendance. The decision for full capacity stemmed from Texas allowing all businesses to operate at 100% capacity without mask restrictions. The Rangers were criticized by United States health officials and President Joe Biden for hosting a full-capacity event, calling it "a mistake" and "not responsible". However, former White House medical staff member Dr. William Lang argued that lowering rates of COVID-19 infections and increasing rates of vaccination in Texas gave the decision to hold the game at full capacity more credibility. The Rangers did not enforce a mask policy at the home opener or any of their games. Although the seven-day average of COVID-19 cases in Tarrant County more than doubled following the home opener, there was no evidence of causation occurring as a result of the opening game.

After a extremely lowly 60–102 season in 2021, their worst since 1973, the Rangers went on a spending spree in free agency, most notably signing Toronto Blue Jays second baseman Marcus Semien, Los Angeles Dodgers shortstop Corey Seager and bringing back former starting pitcher Martin Perez after three seasons away from the team. However, despite the offseason spending spree and slight improvement from the previous season, it still wasn’t enough for the Rangers to contend as they finished 68–94, good enough for 4th place in the AL West; they were also a franchise and league worst 15–35 in one run games. The Rangers fired Chris Woodward on August 15, 2022, with Tony Beasley taking his place as interim manager for the rest of the year. Two days after Woodward's firing, the Rangers fired President of Baseball Operations (and former Rangers general manager) Jon Daniels, after six consecutive losing seasons. Chris Young, who was named general manager in 2020 to take over the role from Daniels, was named the new club president. On October 21, 2022, the Rangers hired 3-time World Series winning manager Bruce Bochy. During the offseason, the Rangers signed longtime New York Mets superstar starting pitcher Jacob deGrom to a 5 year, $185 million dollar contract.

Ballpark
Globe Life Field, in Arlington, Texas, began serving as the home of the Texas Rangers in 2020. Globe Life and Accident Insurance Company, a subsidiary of McKinney-based Torchmark Corporation, owns the naming rights for the facility through 2048. The new ballpark is located across the street just south of Choctaw Stadium, the Rangers' previous home. Choctaw Stadium was previously named The Ballpark in Arlington, the original name of the facility which opened in 1994. The stadium name changed to Ameriquest Field in Arlington in 2004. With the crisis in the mortgage industry, Ameriquest gave up the naming rights to the stadium in 2007 and the stadium became known as Rangers Ballpark in Arlington.  This name would remain until the ballpark naming rights were sold to Globe Life and Accident Insurance Company in 2014 changing the ballpark name to Globe Life Park in Arlington.  The original Arlington, Texas home of the Texas Rangers was Arlington Stadium and was located north of where Choctaw Stadium is now. Arlington Stadium was torn down to make room for The Ballpark in Arlington.

Uniforms

Washington: 1961–1971
As the second iteration of the Washington Senators, the team's first home uniforms featured navy pinstripes and navy-trimmed red letters. "SENATORS" was written in a style reminiscent of the Boston Red Sox's uniforms. Road gray uniforms simply featured "WASHINGTON" in navy block letters with navy numbers. Caps were all-navy with a red block "W" with white trim.

In 1963, the uniforms returned to a design similar to the final uniforms worn by the original Senators, with "Senators" in script letters and an underline tail that flowed after the second "s". However, the color scheme was reversed on the letters, with red serving as the dominant color. The cap also adopted the "curly W" insignia that was later used by the modern-day Washington Nationals. In 1968, the cap color became all-red with the "curly W" now in white with navy trim. Pinstripes would be removed from the home uniform in 1969.

1972–1982
The Rangers debuted in the Dallas Metroplex wearing double-knit polyester buttoned uniforms. Both the home white and road gray uniforms feature "RangerS" in red serif rounded letters with blue drop shadows (with a white star at the bottom of the "R"), and the back of the uniform featured red block letters for the player names and red block numbers with blue trim. Red, white and blue stripes adorn the collar and sleeves. The original cap is blue with a red brim, and has a white "T" trimmed in red emblazoned on it.

In 1975, the Rangers went with a two-button pullover design and changed the road uniform color to powder blue. The home uniform design remained mostly the same save for the blue trim on the player's name. However, the front of the road uniform was changed to "TEXAS" in red letters with white and blue trim, which was also used on the numbers. Player names became dark royal blue. This style was used for one season before the blue trim disappeared and the middle three letters became lowercase in the word "TexaS". Also in 1976, a left sleeve patch was added containing the Texas map and red star on a red, white and blue shield with "RANGERS" in red letters on top. For 1976 only, the patch featured "1776" and "1976" in white in commemoration of the United States bicentennial. Names would be dropped from the uniform in 1980, but returned the following season, during which the uniforms returned to a traditional buttoned style and a new circular sleeve patch featuring the "TR" in red letters in front of a baseball and blue Texas map was added.

1983–1993
This period saw the Rangers deemphasize red in favor of blue on their uniforms. The home white uniform now had "RANGERS" in uppercase letters, with the trim on the player names removed. The road uniform color was changed to a dark royal blue, and "TEXAS" was also featured in red-trimmed white uppercase letters. The "TR" patch minus the circle was moved to the left chest, and a road all-blue cap was unveiled featuring a red "T" trimmed in white. This design was used for one season. Then in 1984, the Rangers made slight tweaks to their uniforms, unveiling a red alternate uniform and going with a script "Rangers" in front. The sleeve patch, now featuring the script "Rangers" in red on a baseball and a blue Texas map, was added, and left chest numbers were also emblazoned.

Late in 1985, the Rangers returned to wearing road gray uniforms. This design has "TEXAS" in blue block letters with white trim; the same color scheme was also used on the player's name and number. Both this uniform and the existing home uniform removed the collar and sleeve striping. In addition, the all-blue cap returned after a two-year absence, replacing the original red-brimmed blue cap. Both blue and red alternate uniforms were retired.

1994–2000
The Rangers changed its uniforms in anticipation of moving to The Ballpark in Arlington. Red became the primary color and blue was relegated to accent color, and silver was also added. The home white uniforms featured red piping and "RANGERS" in red serif rounded letters with blue trim. That same color scheme was used on the player's name and number. The road gray uniforms featured red sleeve piping and "TEXAS" in red serif rounded letters with white trim; the player's name and number also adopted this color scheme. A new red cap was also unveiled, featuring a white "T" with a blue drop-shadow. Blue trim was later added on the road uniform letters. Starting in 1996, the Rangers sported a new sleeve patch. This patch is a blue diamond with silver pinstripes, and contained a silver star surrounded by a red circle that featured two baseballs and the full team name in white letters. 

For the 2000 season, the Rangers kept their home uniforms, but the road uniforms were changed anew. Blue again became the dominant color on the road uniform letters, and a new all-blue cap was released, essentially the inverse of the all-red cap. A new blue alternate uniform was also released, featuring white letters with red and blue trim. A Texas flag patch adorned the home and road uniforms.

2001–2008
Starting in 2001, the Rangers again went with blue as a dominant color, while also adding black as an accent color. Black drop shadows were added on the home and road uniform letters, as were silver accents on the blue alternate uniform. The home uniform brought back the left chest numbers but removed the chest piping, while the Texas flag patch was added on the blue alternate uniform. The Rangers wore three different caps during this period. For both home and road games, the Rangers sported either an all-blue cap or a black-brimmed blue cap with the "T" in white and red drop shadows, while for road games only, the all-blue cap with a red "T" on a white drop shadow was used.

In 2004, the Rangers added a white alternate sleeveless uniform, containing the red "T" with white trim and blue drop shadows in front, along with blue piping and blue letters with red trim. The chest number was moved to the right. In 2006, the Rangers added a gray road alternate sleeveless uniform, similar to their primary road uniform but with the addition of chest numbers and blue piping, and the absence of black drop shadows. Both sleeveless uniforms were paired with blue undershirts. The red "T" all-blue cap which was not worn in 2004 and 2005 was brought back to be worn with the road gray alternates. However, the black-brimmed blue cap was retired permanently.

2009–2019
In 2009, the Rangers unveiled slight updates to their uniform design. The home uniform now featured "TEXAS" in blue letters with red and white trim along with black drop shadows. The chest numbers were also removed. In addition, the block letters and numbers added some pointed accents similar to the "TEXAS" wordmark. The Rangers also added a red home alternate uniform, which was essentially the inverse of their blue alternate uniform. This uniform also brought back the all-red cap which was last worn in 2000. Starting in 2014, the black drop shadows and silver accents were removed. While blue remained a primary color used on all road games and most home games, the Rangers would occasionally wear red accessories with the home white uniform.

2020–present
As in 1994, the Rangers changed their uniforms upon moving to a new ballpark, this time in Globe Life Field. The home white uniforms now featured a script "Rangers" wordmark in blue with white and red trim, and letters were blue with white trim and red drop shadows. As with the previous white uniform, this set is worn with either blue or red accessories. The road gray, red alternate, and blue alternate uniform remained mostly the same except for the updated letters and the addition of drop shadows. On the red alternate uniform, a blue-brimmed red cap with "TX" in front of a red Texas map in front was added as an alternate to the all-red cap. Also new was a powder blue alternate, featuring the "Rangers" script in white with royal blue trim and red drop shadows, and is paired with a powder blue cap with royal blue brim emblazoned with a white "T" on a red drop shadow. Unlike the other uniforms, the powder blue alternate does not have a corresponding batting helmet; instead, the royal blue batting helmet was used.

In 2023, due to MLB and Nike's new four-uniform plus City Connect limit, the Rangers' red uniform was retired. However, the red equipment worn with the uniform were retained for select home games.

Mascot

Rangers Captain is the mascot for the Texas Rangers. Introduced in 2002, he is a palomino-style horse, dressed in the team's uniform. He wears the uniform number 72 in honor of 1972, the year the Rangers relocated to Arlington. He has multiple uniforms to match each of the variants the team wears. Captain's outfits sometimes match a theme the team is promoting; on April 24, 2010, he was dressed up like Elvis Presley as part of an Elvis-themed night.

Achievements

Baseball Hall of Famers

Chuck Hinton and Frank Howard, who played for the franchise in Washington (although Howard played for the Rangers in 1972), are listed on the Washington Hall of Stars display at Nationals Park in Washington. So are Gil Hodges and Mickey Vernon, who managed the "New Senators". Vernon also played for the "Old Senators", who became the Minnesota Twins.

Ford C. Frick Award recipients

Texas Sports Hall of Fame

Texas Rangers Hall of Fame

The Texas Rangers Hall of Fame was created in 2003 to honor the careers of former Texas Rangers players, managers, executives, and broadcasters. There are currently 22 members. The Hall is located in Globe Life Park in Arlington, behind right field. The Hall's two levels cover  and included a 235-seat theater and various plaques, photos, and memorabilia. It can accommodate up to 600 people.

Retired numbers

All of the Rangers' retired numbers are directly incorporated into the posted dimensions of Globe Life Field. The left-field foul line distance is 329 feet (Beltré), the deepest point of the ballpark is 410 feet (Young), straightaway center field is 407 feet (Rodríguez), the right-field foul line is 326 feet (Oates), and the backstop distance, measured from the rear point of home plate via a line running through second base, is 42 feet (Robinson). A sign just inside the left-field foul line is marked as 334 feet to honor Ryan. The power alleys, at 372 feet in left and 374 feet in right, respectively pay homage to the Rangers' first season in Arlington (1972) and first .500 season (1974).

Team captains
Buddy Bell 1985
Michael Young 2005–2012
Adrián Beltré 2013–2018

Roster

Season-by-season records

Team records

These are partial records of players with the best performance in distinct statistical categories during a single season.

Batting
 Games played: 163, Al Oliver (1980)
 Runs: 133, Alex Rodriguez (2001)
 Hits: 221, Michael Young (2005)
 Doubles: 52, Michael Young (2006)
 Triples: 14, Rubén Sierra (1989)
 Home runs: 57, Alex Rodriguez (2002)
 Runs batted in: 157, Juan González (1998)
 Stolen bases: 52, Bump Wills (1978)
 Batting average: .359, Josh Hamilton (2010)
 Slugging percentage: .643, Juan González (1996)

Pitching
 Wins: 25, Ferguson Jenkins (1974)
 Saves: 49, Francisco Cordero (2004)
 Complete games: 29, Ferguson Jenkins (1974)
 Strikeouts: 301, Nolan Ryan (1989)

Radio and television

Radio
KRLD-FM 105.3 FM
KRLD (AM) NewsRadio 1080 will carry any games that conflict with previously scheduled programming on 105.3 The FAN.
KFLC 1270 AM (Spanish)

In addition to the flagship stations listed above, Rangers games can be heard on affiliates throughout much of Texas, and also in parts of Oklahoma, Arkansas, Louisiana, New Mexico, and Kansas. Eric Nadel is the primary play-by-play announcer. He has called games for the club since 1979 beginning on television broadcasts, then moving exclusively to radio beginning in 1985. He became the primary announcer after the late Mark Holtz moved to television. Currently, Nadel provides play-by-play in the 1st, 2nd, 5th, 6th, 8th, and 9th innings, and color commentary for the other innings. On December 11, 2013, he was awarded the 2014 Ford C. Frick Award by the National Baseball Hall of Fame and Museum for excellence in broadcasting. Matt Hicks now shares the broadcast booth with Nadel. He joined the broadcast in 2012 after Steve Busby moved from radio to television to replace Dave Barnett. Hicks provides play-by-play in the 3rd, 4th, and 7th innings, and color commentary for the other innings. Jared Sandler hosts the pre-game and post-game shows, and also fills in whenever Nadel or Hicks have a day off. For the Spanish radio affiliates, Eleno Ornelas is the play-by-play announcer, and former Rangers pitcher José Guzmán is the color analyst.

Television
Texas Rangers games currently air on regional television network Bally Sports Southwest. During the 2016 season, they had an average 3.96 rating and 105,000 viewers on primetime broadcasts. Due to the Rangers having to play many of their Sunday home games at night, the team has been featured frequently on ESPN's Sunday Night Baseball during the summer months. Rangers games can also be seen on MLB on Fox and TBS.

Since 2017, Dave Raymond is the primary television play-by-play announcer and former MLB pitcher C. J. Nitkowski is the primary color commentator. Nitkowski also fills in for Raymond on play-by-play for select games. Raymond replaced Steve Busby, who since 1982 on both TV and radio has had various stints in various positions on Rangers broadcasts from play-by-play to color commentary to pre-game and post-game analysis. In June 2012, Busby moved back to television play-by-play after Dave Barnett left his position as game announcer following an episode in which he experienced speech difficulties. Beginning in 2016, Raymond substituted for Busby on select games. Previously the primary color commentator, Tom Grieve still broadcasts many games. A former Rangers player and general manager, Grieve has been in the TV booth since 1995, following the end of his tenure as GM. Another former Ranger, Mark McLemore, has substituted for Grieve in the past and often joins the booth for an inning during home games. He and former Ranger Iván Rodríguez are among the pre-game and post-game analysts used on Fox Sports Southwest. FSSW pre-game and post-game shows are hosted by a rotation among Dana Larson, John Rhadigan, Ric Renner, Erin Hartigan, and David Murphy. In-game reporters include Rhadigan, Hartigan, Lesley McCaslin, and Rangers employee Emily Jones (formerly of FSSW).

Minor league affiliations

The Texas Rangers farm system consists of seven minor league affiliates.

See also
List of Texas Rangers first-round draft picks
List of Texas Rangers managers
List of Texas Rangers no-hitters
List of Texas Rangers Opening Day starting pitchers
List of Texas Rangers owners and executives
Lone Star Series – rivalry with the Houston Astros
Texas Rangers award winners and league leaders

References

External links 

 

 
Major League Baseball teams
Cactus League
Professional baseball teams in Texas
Baseball teams established in 1961
1961 establishments in Washington, D.C.
Companies that filed for Chapter 11 bankruptcy in 2010
Baseball in the Dallas–Fort Worth metroplex